Evergreen Cemetery is a burial ground located in Rutland Town, Vermont. It is managed by the Rutland Evergreen Cemetery Association. Evergreen was founded as Pine Hill Cemetery in 1861, and the name was subsequently changed.

History
Pine Hill Cemetery was dedicated on 16 October 1861, with William A. Burnett as the first superintendent. The site took its name from the location where it was constructed, Rutland's Pine Hill, and was later changed to Evergreen Cemetery. Initial construction included walkways, a vault, a front wall, and a gateway of marble. In addition, early construction included seven fountains, one of which (in Section C) is still working.

Description
Evergreen Cemetery was constructed on a 45 acre site, and has been expanded by purchase and donation. Its entrance is located at 465 West Street in Rutland Town, near the border with Rutland City, and across the street from the Rutland Town Hall. designed in the rural cemetery tradition, the location was originally a pine forest and retains many aspects of a wood or grove. It is enclosed by walls of varying heights, many of which are made of local marble, and numerous vines and flowering shrubs enhance the cemetery's appearance. Winding paths and roads traverse the location as they climb a series of knolls.

Notable burials
Several individuals prominent in business, politics, the arts, and other fields are buried at Evergreen Cemetery. These include:

 Benjamin Alvord, Union Army Brigadier General
 Percival W. Clement, governor of Vermont
 Julia C. R. Dorr, poet
 Solomon Foot, U.S. Senator
 George Tisdale Hodges, U.S. Congressman
 Charles Herbert Joyce, U.S. Congressman
 John A. Mead, governor of Vermont
 William T. Nichols, Union Army officer and businessman
 John B. Page, governor of Vermont
 Edward H. Ripley, Union Army officer
 William Y. W. Ripley, Civil War Medal of Honor Recipient
 Charles Manley Smith, governor of Vermont
 Bert L. Stafford, mayor of Rutland
 Robert Stafford, governor of Vermont and U.S. Senator
 Charles A. Thompson, Civil War Medal of Honor Recipient
 Charles K. Williams. governor of Vermont

References

External links
 

Rural cemeteries
Cemeteries in Vermont
1861 establishments in Vermont
Buildings and structures in Rutland, Vermont
Burials at Evergreen Cemetery (Rutland, Vermont)